Kushiro Station can refer to two different train stations in Japan:
, on the Nemuro Main Line located in Kushiro, Hokkaido, Japan
, on the Sanin Main Line located in Hamada, Shimane, Japan